Indonesia competed at the 2010 Asian Beach Games held in Muscat, Oman from December 8, 2010 to December 16, 2010.

Indonesia sent 110 athletes, 67 men and 43 women, who competed in 12 sports.

Competitors

Medals

Medal table

Medalists

References 
Official Site
Indonesian Medals Page

Nations at the 2010 Asian Beach Games
2010
Asian Beach Games